The Head of Tambov Oblast is the head of government of that region of Russia.

History of office
In the late 1991, the President of Russia Boris Yeltsin appointed the first heads of the newly established post-Soviet executive authorities in the regions. On 11 December 1991 Vladimir Babenko, chief of Tambov regional hospital and people's deputy of the RSFSR, was appointed head of administration of Tambov Oblast. Later this region refused to rename the office into governor, as most of other oblasts did.

The title of office was changed to head of Tambov Oblast in 2022.

List

References 

 
Politics of Tambov Oblast
Tambov